Arius cous is a species of sea catfish in the family Ariidae. It was described by Josef Hyrtl in 1859. It is known from the western Indian Ocean, in the Middle East.

References

cous
Fish described in 1859